Nuffield Place is a country house near the village of Nuffield  in the Chiltern Hills in South Oxfordshire, England, just over  east of Wallingford.

The house was completed in 1914. Sir William Morris (later created Viscount Nuffield) had it enlarged in 1933 and lived there until his death in 1963. Lord Nuffield was buried at Holy Trinity Parish Church in the village, and bequeathed Nuffield Place and its contents to Nuffield College, Oxford, as a museum. The college later gave the house and part of the estate to the National Trust.

Lord Nuffield was fond of clocks and his bedroom contains eight. His bedroom also has a miniature workshop, in a cupboard, containing a vice and metalworking tools, as well as a jar containing Lord Nuffield's own preserved appendix.

See also
 Greys Court, a nearby National Trust property
 Museum of Oxford

References

External links
 
Nuffield Place website

1914 establishments in England
Buildings and structures completed in 1914
National Trust properties in Oxfordshire
Historic house museums in Oxfordshire
Nuffield College, Oxford